Sri Sri Krishna Balaram Mandir, also called ISKCON Vrindavan, is one of the major ISKCON temples in the world. It is a Gaudiya Vaishnava temple located in the city of Vrindavan, Mathura district, in the Indian state of Uttar Pradesh. The temple is dedicated to the Hindu gods Krishna and Balarama. The other deities of temple are Radha Krishna and Gauranga Nityananda.

History
The temple was inaugurated in 1977.

Deities

The Presiding Deities of the temple are Krishna and Balarama at the central altar. On the right altar are Radha Krishna as Sri Sri Radha Shyamsundar with Gopi, Lalita and Vishakha. On the left altar are Chaitanya Mahaprabhu with Nityananda, and of ISKCON Founder Acharya and 32nd Acarya in Gaudiya Vaishnava Disciplic Succession A. C. Bhaktivedanta Swami Prabhupada and his Guru Bhaktisiddhanta Sarasvati. Krishna-Balaram Mandir enforces one of the highest standards of cleanliness and of deity worship in all of Vrindavan.

Near the temple, at the entrance to the complex, is located the samadhi mandir shrine of His Divine Grace A. C. Bhaktivedanta Swami Srila Prabhupada, built of white marble.

Festivals 

 Janmashtami
 Radhashtami
 Holi
 Gaur Purnima
 Chaturmaas
 Kartik Damodar Maas
 Diwali
 Appearance and Disappearance Days of Vaishnava Acharyas and Saints.

See also
Prem Mandir Vrindavan
Banke Bihari Temple
Radha Rani Temple,  Barsana
Radha Raman Temple
Nandmahar Dham
Radha Damodar Temple, Vrindavan 
Radha Madan Mohan Temple, Vrindavan
Radha Krishna Vivah Sthali, Bhandirvan

References

External links

 Krishna-Balaram Mandir 24-hour Kirtan official web site
 Live video Darshan From ISKCON Vrindavan Temples
 ISKCON Vrindavan official website

International Society for Krishna Consciousness temples
Hindu temples in Mathura district
Krishna temples
Vrindavan